The Chroy Changva Bridge (also known as the Cambodian-Japanese Friendship Bridge) is a 709-meter bridge that crosses the Tonle Sap River in Phnom Penh, originally built in 1963, with Japanese aid. Severely damaged during the civil war in 1972 and 1973, it remained closed until it reopened on the 26th of February  1994
 
About 10 km north of it there is another bridge the Prek Kdam Bridge, then the Prek Pnov Bridge and no more bridges on the Tonle Sap, a temporary bridge should open in April 2018, the construction of a concrete bridge should start just after that.

1972 attack

On 24 March 1972 People's Army of Vietnam/Khmer Rouge Sappers blew up an explosive-packed vehicle on the bridge, collapsing several spans into the Mekong River and killing three civilians.

References

Road bridges in Phnom Penh
Bridges completed in 1963
Cambodia–Japan relations